"The Last Film" is a song by English band Kissing the Pink, released as both a 7" and 12" single from their debut studio album, Naked (1983).

Their only Top 20 hit, it peaked at No. 19 on the UK Singles Chart. The single features the non-album track, "Shine" as its B-side.

Sylvia Griffin sang the middle 8 but left the band whilst they were still recording the rest of the album.

When lead vocalist Nick Whitecross was asked about the lyrics to the song he said that they were “just about a soldier who sat in a tent watching one of those 40s or 50s Hollywood war films just before he’s about to go out and fight for real. It’s not controversial, war is horrible and unglamorous.”

Track listing
7" single
"The Last Film"
"Shine"

12" single
"The Last Film (Extended Version)"
"Shine"
"The Last Film (The Hymn Version)"

Chart performance

References

External links
 

Kissing the Pink songs
1983 singles
1983 songs
Song recordings produced by Colin Thurston